Gusztáv Hennyey (25 September 1888 – 14 June 1977) was a Hungarian politician and military officer, who served as Minister of Foreign Affairs in 1944 for a month. After the First World War he worked as a military attaché in Paris, Belgrade and Athens. He returned to home in 1933 and became Chief of Military Intelligence at the Ministry of Defence. When Hungary entered to the Second World War (1941) he served as commander of the Second Corps.

In 1944, Géza Lakatos appointed him Minister of Foreign Affairs. After the Arrow Cross Party's coup (15 October 1944) he was arrested along with the most of the ministers and moderate, magisterial politicians. Hennyey was taken to Sopron and later Bavaria, when the Soviet Red Army approached continually. After the war the new Hungarian government demanded his extradition like as a war criminal. The Office of Strategic Services captured Hennyey but later let free. Hennyey lived in Munich until his death.

References
 Magyar Életrajzi Lexikon

1888 births
1977 deaths
Military personnel from Cluj-Napoca
Foreign ministers of Hungary
Hungarian generals
Hungarian expatriates in France
Officers Crosses of the Order of Merit of the Federal Republic of Germany
Politicians from Cluj-Napoca